Randy Edelman (born June 10, 1947) is an American musician, producer, and composer for film and television. He began his career as a member of Broadway's pit orchestras; he later produced solo albums for songs that were picked up by leading music performers including The Carpenters, Barry Manilow, and Dionne Warwick. He is known for his work in comedy films. He has been awarded many prestigious awards along with two nominations for a Golden Globe Award, a BAFTA Award, and twelve BMI Awards. Edelman was given an honorary doctorate in fine arts by the University of Cincinnati in 2004.

Some of Edelman's best known films scores include Twins, Ghostbusters II, Kindergarten Cop, Beethoven, The Distinguished Gentleman, Gettysburg, The Mask, Dragonheart, Daylight, and XXX. He also wrote the theme of the popular television series MacGyver. Many of his musical pieces have been reused in television advertising, trailers, Disney movies, and award shows.

Life and career
Edelman was born on 10 June 1947 in Paterson, New Jersey, to a Jewish family. He was raised in Teaneck, New Jersey, the son of a first-grade teacher and an accountant, and graduated from Teaneck High School in 1965. He attended the Cincinnati Conservatory of Music before heading to New York where he played piano in Broadway pit orchestras. He produced several solo albums of songs, some of which were later recorded by The Carpenters ("I Can't Make Music", "Piano Picker" and "You"), Barry Manilow ("Weekend in New England"), "If Love Is Real" from Olivia Newton-John's Making a Good Thing Better, Dionne Warwick ("The Laughter and the Tears"), Blood, Sweat & Tears ("Blue Street") and many others before moving to Los Angeles. Edelman started to work there in television and film scoring, while producing his solo albums which found a cult following in the United Kingdom, Europe, and Japan.

Musical scores
One of his first film scores was for the 1973 film Executive Action, which put forward a conspiracy theory concerning the assassination of John Fitzgerald Kennedy in 1963. In the mid-1980s, Edelman wrote the theme to and scored many episodes of MacGyver, a popular television series starring Richard Dean Anderson.

During the 1980s and early 1990s, he also collaborated with Ivan Reitman, producing scores for several of his comedies, including Ghostbusters II, Twins and Kindergarten Cop. He also contributed to Beethoven; The Last of the Mohicans; The Distinguished Gentleman; The Mask; Daylight; Anaconda; XXX; Gettysburg; My Cousin Vinny; While You Were Sleeping; Dragonheart; Shanghai Noon; Six Days, Seven Nights; The Indian in the Cupboard; Billy Madison; Angels in the Outfield; and EDtv to name a few.

Edelman was honored with the Richard Kirk Award at the 2003 BMI Film and TV Awards. The award is given annually to a composer who has made significant contributions to film and television music. In 2004, he received an honorary doctorate in fine arts from the University of Cincinnati. He and three other honorees distinguished in other fields, including Coretta Scott King were given the degree.

He produced the scores for the 2008 film The Mummy: Tomb of the Dragon Emperor. This score was recorded at Abbey Road Studios in London, where in 2010 Edelman also recorded and composed the Irish flavored music score for Amy Adams's film Leap Year. He was awarded the Goldspirit Award (named in honor of Jerry Goldsmith) for best comedy score of 2011 for the Leap Year soundtrack CD on Varèse Sarabande.

Scores reused elsewhere
While some of the films scored by Edelman were not commercial successes, the music was often reused elsewhere. Themes he wrote for Kindergarten Cop (in particular Rain Ride), Dragonheart, Dragon: The Bruce Lee Story (including the film's love theme Bruce and Linda), Gettysburg, and other films have been widely used in television advertising, film trailers, Disney movies including Mulan, and during the Academy Awards. Themes from his score for Come See the Paradise have been used in film trailers more than cues from any other film soundtrack.

NBC Sports
His music from The Adventures of Brisco County, Jr. is featured during NBC's Olympic Games coverage when upcoming events are being announced. In addition it was used during NBC's coverage of the 1997 World Series. At the end of the 1996 Summer Olympics, NBC used the closing music of Gettysburg. In the 1990s, Edelman composed the popular theme music for NBC's NFL telecasts which was used for the 1995–97 seasons through Super Bowl XXXII.

Personal life
Edelman has been married to singer Jackie DeShannon since June 3, 1976. DeShannon is known for 1960s hits including "When You Walk in the Room", "Put a Little Love in Your Heart" and "What the World Needs Now Is Love". DeShannon had a few months' long, annulled first marriage. She and Edelman have a son, Noah D. Edelman.

Musical discography (as artist and songwriter)

Solo albums
Randy Edelman – MGM Records, 1972 (LP)
The Laughter and the Tears – MGM Records, 1972 (LP)
Outside In - MGM Records, 1972 (LP)
Prime Cuts – 20th Century Records, 1974 (LP and CD) (No. 95 AUS)
Farewell Fairbanks – 20th Century Records, 1975 (LP and CD) (No. 54 AUS)
If Love Is Real – Arista Records, 1977 (LP and CD)
You're the One – Arista Records, 1979 (LP and CD)
Up-Town Up-Tempo: The Best of Randy Edelman – 20th Century Records, 1979 (LP)On Time – Rocket Records, 1982 (LP)Randy Edelman and His Piano – PRT Records, 1984 (LP and CD)Switch of the Seasons – PRT Records (Polar), 1985 (LP)Up-Town Up-Tempo Woman (compilation album) – Warwick Reflection Records, 1987 (CD)And His Piano ... The Very Best of Randy Edelman – Revola/Cherry Red Records, 2003 (CD)The Pacific Flow to Abbey Road – Cherry Red (UK) / Varèse Sarabande (US), 2011 (CD)

Charted solo singles
"Everybody Wants to Find a Bluebird" (March 1975) – No. 92 US / No. 18 AC (US)
"Concrete and Clay" (March 1976) – No. 11 AC (US), No. 79 (AUS) No. 11 UK - cover version of the hit for the British pop group Unit 4 + 2 
"Uptown Uptempo Woman" (September 1976) – No. 25 UK
"You" (January 1977) – No. 49 UK
"Can't It All Be Love"  (November 1977) - No. 99 Canada (RPM)
"Nobody Made Me" (July 1982) – No. 60 UK

Partial list of artists who have covered Edelman's songs (both music and lyrics)
Barry Manilow – "Weekend in New England" (No. 10, US)
The Carpenters – "I Can't Make Music", "You", "Piano Picker"
Labelle – "Isn't it a Shame"
Olivia Newton-John – "If Love Is Real"
Nelly – "My Place"
Dionne Warwick – "You Are the Sunlight, I Am the Moon", "The Laughter and Tears", "Give a Little Laughter"
Blood Sweat and Tears – "Blue Street"
Jackie DeShannon – "Sunny Days", "Let the Sailors Dance"
Agnetha Fältskog – "Turn the World Around"
The Fifth Dimension – "Everybody Wants to Call You Sweetheart"
Kool and the Gang – "Amore Amore"
Bing Crosby – "The Woman on Your Arm"
Shirley Bassey – "Isn't It a Shame"
Nancy Wilson – "The Laughter and the Tears"
Rosemary Clooney – "You"
Petula Clark – "Make a Time for Lovin'"

Filmography 
Film

Television

Awards, milestones and announcements
Platinum and gold Records 

Barry Manilow Greatest Hits, Live,

This One's for You

The Carpenters: "A Song for You", Now And Then, and A Kind of HushOlivia Newton-John: Making A Good Thing BetterNelly: SuitNow 17: "My Place"Last of the Mohicans (soundtrack)

Saturn Awards
 "Dragonheart" nominated by Academy of Science Fiction, Fantasy & Horror Films (Saturn Award for Best Music)

International Film Music Critics Association Nomination
 "Ten Commandments": Nominated by the IFMCA (International Film Music Critics Association) for
Best Original Score for Television for ABC's mini-series

Honorary Doctorate of Fine Arts
 University of Cincinnati: Recipient of Honorary Doctorate of Fine Arts 

Broadcast Music, Inc. (BMI)
 Recipient of BMI's highest honor, the Richard Kirk Lifetime Achievement Award 
 Top Grossing Film Award: 27 Dresses Top Grossing Film Award: The Mask Top Grossing Film Award: The Mummy: Tomb of the Dragon Emperor Top Grossing Film Award: The Last of the Mohicans Top Grossing Film Award: XXX Top Grossing Film Award: Kindergarten Cop Top Grossing Film Award: Six Days Seven Nights Top Grossing Film Award: Ghostbusters II Top Grossing Film Award: Anaconda Top Grossing Film Award: Twins Top Grossing Film Award: While You Were Sleeping Top TV Series Award: MacGyverSpotlight Award: Awarded for two decades of NBC's Randy Edelman Olympic Theme

Emmy Awards
 Winner: "Atlanta Olympics NBC Broadcast" Emmy Award 

Golden Globes Award
 Nominated: Last of the Mohicans ( Best Original Score - Motion Picture) 

British Academy of Film and Television Awards Nomination
 Last of the Mohicans: Nominated (Best Original Film Score) BAFTA Award for Best Film Music

Kautz Alumni Masters Awards
 University of Cincinnati: Kautz Alumni Masters Award for Outstanding Alumnus 

Goldspirit Awards
 Leap Year (film)'': Named in honor of Jerry Goldsmith as Best Comedy Score  Long Island International Film Expo'''
 Lifetime Achievement Award: In Film Scoring and Composition 
2018 Composer and Lyricist Guild
Lifetime Achievement Award L.A.

References

External links

1947 births
20th-century American composers
20th-century American Jews
20th-century American male musicians
21st-century American composers
21st-century American Jews
21st-century American male musicians
American film score composers
American male film score composers
American male singers
American male songwriters
American television composers
Animated film score composers
Epic Records artists
Jewish American film score composers
Jewish American television composers
Living people
Male television composers
MCA Records artists
Musicians from Paterson, New Jersey
Singers from New Jersey
Songwriters from New Jersey
Sony Classical Records artists
Teaneck High School alumni
Varèse Sarabande Records artists